Ivaylazda is a rural locality (a selo) in Tlogobsky Selsoviet, Gunibsky District, Republic of Dagestan, Russia. The population was 70 as of 2010.

Geography 
Ivaylazda is located 44 km northwest of Gunib (the district's administrative centre) by road, on the Kunada River. Basar and Baldutl are the nearest rural localities.

References 

Rural localities in Gunibsky District